David Afriyie Obeng (born 3 December 1994), known professionally as Friyie, is a Canadian singer, songwriter, and rapper. His 2017 single "Money Team" became the soundtrack to the Mayweather vs. McGregor press conferences. His debut extended play, ANF: Ain’t Nothing Free, was released on March 22, 2019, by BONG Ent and Empire, which received positive reviews from Now and Exclaim!, who gave the EP a 9/10 rating.
Notable collaborators include Roddy Ricch and Tory Lanez, who both featured on his project, while others include Bun B, Rick Ross, and Dexta Daps.

Early life 

Friyie was born on December 3, 1994 in Toronto, Ontario to first generation immigrants of Ghanaian decent. He grew up in a rough neighbourhood of Jane and Finch, notorious for gang and crime activity. Friyie's early interest in music and business kept him apart from the street life. He attended and graduated from York University.

Career

2016 – 2019
Friyie's single "Come and Get It" was produced by TwoTone. The song was featured on DJ Charlie B summer mixtape.
In the same year worked on Giinchy 5x by Meeno Giinchy, appearing on eight tracks. In 2017 his song "Money Team" amassed over one million views on YouTube, featured on Spotify's Rap Caviar playlist, and Billboard Hip-Hop News. In the same year Friyie opened for Cardi B at the T-Mobile Area in Las Vegas. In 2019, he released his debut project ANF: Ain't Nothing Free.

2020 – present
In June 2020, Friyie released his follow up EP Before the Flight, with a deluxe version released in September. On July 31, 2020, he featured on Dexta Daps' album Vent which debuted at number 10 on the Billboard Reggae Chart.

Discography

Extended plays
 2019: ANF: Ain't Nothing Free
 2020: Before the Flight
 2020: Before the Flight (Deluxe)

Mixtapes
 2016: Giinchy 5x
 2012: Hottest in the City Vol.1

Filmography

References

External links
 
 

1994 births
Living people
Black Canadian musicians
Canadian hip hop singers
Canadian male rappers
Canadian pop singers
Canadian rhythm and blues singers
Canadian songwriters
Canadian people of Ghanaian descent
Canadian record producers
Rappers from Toronto
Writers from Toronto
Canadian male poets
21st-century Canadian rappers
21st-century Canadian male singers